Anis Riahi (born 30 May 1971) is a retired Tunisian decathlete.

Riahi won the gold medal in pole vault at the 1996 African Championships. In decathlon he won gold medals at the 1996 African Championships, the 1999 All-Africa Games and 2004 African Championships, the silver medals at the 1995 All-Africa Games and the 2002 African Championships, and a bronze medal at the 1997 Jeux de la Francophonie. He also won the decathlon at the 1997 and 1999 Pan Arab Games. He became Tunisian champion in different events six times, and two in the decathlon.

His personal best score is 7642 points, achieved in July 2000 in Talence.

References

1971 births
Living people
Tunisian decathletes
Tunisian male pole vaulters
African Games gold medalists for Tunisia
African Games medalists in athletics (track and field)
African Games silver medalists for Tunisia
Athletes (track and field) at the 1995 All-Africa Games
Athletes (track and field) at the 1999 All-Africa Games
20th-century Tunisian people
21st-century Tunisian people